The Goods Vehicle Movement Service (GVMS) is a UK government border control information technology system for coordinating the movement of vehicles. It is part of the government's measures for dealing with post-Brexit trade. The system is estimated to need to process 400 million customs declarations per year.

The system will need to go live in January 2021. , the system is still in beta testing, and user testing of the system had only just started, with four months to go before the system needs to go live.

In September 2020, a survey of hauliers showed that over half had not heard of the existence of the GVMS.

References

See also 
 Common Transit Convention
 Operation Fennel

Brexit
Information technology in the United Kingdom
Export and import control